Nadwa ('forum') may refer to:

 Al Nadwa, a daily newspaper in Mecca, Saudi Arabia, between 1958 and 2013
 Nadwa University, an Islamic seminary in Lucknow

See also 
 
 Nadwan, Patna, India
 Nadwasarai, a village in Mau district, Uttar Pradesh, India
 Nadwi (disambiguation)
 Nadvi